The Puduhuapi Formation is a sedimentary formation whose only known outcrops are on Puduhuapi Island of the Chiloé Archipelago, west of Chaitén in western Patagonia, Chile. Lithologies vary from sandstone and siltstone to conglomerate. The sediment that now forms the rock deposited during the Miocene no earlier than 23 million years ago.

See also 
 Geology of Chile
 Chaicayán Group
 Ayacara Formation
 La Cascada Formation
 Vargas Formation

References 

Geologic formations of Chile
Miocene Series of South America
Neogene Chile
Sandstone formations
Siltstone formations
Conglomerate formations
Geology of Los Lagos Region
Mapuche language